Periya Kudumbam is a 1995 Indian Tamil-language drama film, directed by K. S. Ravikumar. The film stars Prabhu, Kanaka and Vineetha, with Manorama, Vijayakumar, Lakshmi, Chandrasekhar, Chithra, Goundamani and Senthil in supporting roles. The film was released on 1 September 1995. The film was a remake of the Telugu film Thodi Kodallu (1994).

Plot 
The story revolves around three brothers, Rathinavel, Thangavel & Manickavel who lead a simple life. All attempts by their cousins to create tiffs amongst them fails, until they take advantage of a weak situation and join a group of people who have similar thoughts.

Cast 

 Prabhu as Rathnavel
 Kanaka as Jothi
 Vineetha as Bharathi
 Manorama as Sivakami
 Vijayakumar as Thangavel
 Lakshmi as Kasthuri
 Chandrasekhar as Manickavel
 Chithra as Shanthi
 Goundamani as Post Master Kanthasamy
 Senthil as Post Man Dhandapani
 K. S. Ravikumar as Chinnapandi
 Kitty as Sundarapandi
Ponnambalam as Veerapandi
 Thalapathi Dinesh as Dheenadayalan
 Vinu Chakravarthy as Minister Thandavarayan
 Sathyapriya as  Rajalakshmi
 Vichithra as Pappamma
 Kalyan Kumar as Rajavel
 K. Kannan as Rajapandi
 Ramesh Khanna as Police Inspector
 Sathyakala as Rajapandi wife
 Crane Manohar as a beggar
S. P. Rajkumar as a guy asking for Kunnakudi bus

Soundtrack 
The music was composed by Ilaiyaraaja and lyrics were by Vaali, Palani Bharathi, R. V. Udayakumar.

References

External links 
 

1990s Tamil-language films
1995 films
Films directed by K. S. Ravikumar
Films scored by Ilaiyaraaja
Indian drama films
Tamil remakes of Telugu films